SCORE Lites Class 12 is an open-wheel air-cooled Volkswagen motor class that competes in the SCORE off-road race series including the Baja 1000, Baja 500, Baja Sur 500, San Felipe 250 and the SCORE Desert Challenge. Four-wheel single and two-seat vehicles less than 1835cc in size.  No production bodied vehicles are allowed in this class.

Vehicle description
Class 12 vehicles are two-wheel drive and most feature a 4130 chromoly tube-frame chassis covered by a composite body. Vehicles must weigh a minimum of 1500 pounds.

Class requirements

Engine
Engine must be Volkswagen Type 1 retaining 2 valves per cylinder. Single-seat vehicles must displace less than 1776cc, and two-seat vehicles must be less than 1835cc. One carburetor that retains a maximum of 2 venturis per carburetor with a size of less than 42mm.

Suspension
Limited to Volkswagen Type 1 configuration. Must be of the twin-beam trailing arm type. Beam is open. Trailing arms are open. Spindles are open.

Body
May not have a production-appearing utility or sport utility body.

Notable race teams
 Michael Crichton Motorsports - 2015 SCORE Lites Class 12 Championship Winner, 2016 Baja 1000 2nd-place finish
 K.I.T. Racing -  Rick St. John
 "Bingham Racing" - Bob Bingham

References

SCORE International (2011). "2011-2015 Off-Road Racing Rules and Regulations".
SCORE International. " 2009 New Classes & Existing Class Rule Amendments"

External links
Official SCORE International website
Cricket score and team member list
Official SCORE International Journal